Maryse Hilsz (7 March 1903 – 30 January 1946) was a French aviator known for high altitude and endurance flights. She served with the French Resistance during World War II and died in an air crash in 1946.

Life 
In 1933 she shared the Fédération Aéronautique Internationale "Woman of the Year Award" with Amelia Earhart, and was the winner of the Harmon Trophy the same year. She had only been flying since 1930, having saved the tuition fee for the aviation license by doing entertainment stunts including parachute jump and standing on the wings of a flying plane.

In 1936 she won the Hélène Boucher Cup flying a Breguet 270 Series.

Hilsz enlisted in the French Air Force after World War II. She and three other crew members died in an air crash at Bourg-en-Bresse on 30 January 1946.

Notable flights

References 

Female resistance members of World War II
Aviators killed in aviation accidents or incidents in France
People from Levallois-Perret
1903 births
1946 deaths
French women aviators
French aviation record holders
French women in World War II
French women aviation record holders
20th-century French women